John Ramsbottom (11 September 1814 – 20 May 1897) was an English mechanical engineer. Born in Todmorden, then on the county border of Yorkshire and Lancashire. Ramsbottom was the son of a steam cotton mill owner.  He learned about steam engines, rebuilding his father's and also invented the weft fork (this has also been attributed to James Bullough) that enabled looms to be run at high speed. He also created many inventions for railways but his main legacy is the split metal piston ring, which he invented and later perfected.  Virtually all reciprocating engines continue to use these today.

Career 
In 1839 Ramsbottom joined Sharp, Roberts and Company of Manchester who made both industrial stationary engines and steam locomotives, and learned of the latter.  He was recommended by Charles Beyer in 1842 to become locomotive superintendent of the Manchester and Birmingham Railway (M&BR).  In 1846 the M&BR merged and became the London and North Western Railway (LNWR), and Ramsbottom became District Superintendent North Eastern Division. In 1857 Ramsbottom became locomotive superintendent of the Northern Division (lines north of Rugby), based at Crewe. He is credited with designing and introducing the first water troughs to be used by locomotives to pick up at speed.

Locomotive designs 

LNWR 2-2-2 Cornwall, rebuilt to his design in 1858
LNWR DX Goods class 0-6-0
LNWR Lady of the Lake Class 2-2-2
LNWR 4ft Shunter 0-4-0ST
LNWR Samson Class 2-4-0
LNWR Newton Class 2-4-0
LNWR Special Tank 0-6-0ST

Innovations

In 1852, he invented the split piston ring, which provided a tight seal of the piston against the cylinder with low friction. His other inventions included the Ramsbottom safety valve, the displacement lubricator, the water trough, a duplex steam hammer which negated the requirement to provide an anvil ten times the weight of the hammer, wrought iron rail chairs and improvements to the Bessemer process for steelmaking.

Professional appointments
Ramsbottom became a member of the Institution of Civil Engineers in 1866. He was also president of the Institution of Mechanical Engineers in 1870 and 1871.

Retirement
Ramsbottom retired in 1871 after his request for a salary increase was turned down by the LNWR Board of Directors, in particular by its chairman, Sir Richard Moon.  The LNWR continued to pay Ramsbottom an annual stipend after he left, valuing his expertise as a consultant if not as an employee.   However, in 1883 Ramsbottom became a consulting engineer and a director of the Lancashire and Yorkshire Railway (L&YR), where his major legacy was the establishment of Horwich Works on a greenfield site near Bolton.  He was also a director of Beyer-Peacock.

References

External links
 http://www.steamindex.com/people/ramsbott.htm
 Obituary

1814 births
1897 deaths
Locomotive builders and designers
English railway mechanical engineers
London and North Western Railway people
English inventors
Tribologists
People from Todmorden